Janakpurdham Railway Station (JNKPE) is a railway station located in Dhanusha District, Madhesh province of Nepal. The station has single platform which is diesel-line operational. The first public train on this station was reached on 03 April 2022 while the inaugurated train was reached on 02 April. The station is a part of Jaynagar-Bijalpura-Bardibas rail section project.

History
Janakpur was a freight station built in 1937 to move timber to Indian Railways during British India. When all the timber in the area cut, the station was opened for the passenger.

In 2014 the Nepal Janakpur Jaynagar Railway service was stopped to convert it in broad gauge line. A new station at Janakpur built and opened for passengers from 03 March 2022.

Time Table
There are two trains a day in each direction, two to Kurtha and two to Jaynagar.

See also 
 Janakpur–Jaynagar Railway

References

External links
Official website

Railway stations in Nepal
Railway stations opened in 2022